Screened Out: Gay Images in Film was a June 2007 film festival broadcast on Turner Classic Movies. The festival, based on the book Screened Out: Playing Gay in Hollywood by Richard Barrios, examined the history of homosexual images in American cinema. Screened Out'''s June schedule coincided with Gay and Lesbian Pride Month.

The series focused not just on films in which homosexual themes or characters were obvious but on those which, because of the Motion Picture Production Code, were concealed or "coded". Screened Out sought out films that were rarely seen and not necessarily included in TCM's film library. The Library of Congress served as the source for one film, 1912's Algie the Miner.

Films
Each night of the festival spotlighted a different Hollywood era or theme.

The Early Years
 Algie the Miner The Monster Exit Smiling The Broadway Melody Way Out West The Office Wife Stage MotherGays Before the Code
 The Sign of the Cross Our Betters Double Harness Queen Christina Wonder Bar The Sport ParadeMen and Women Behind Bars
 Hell's Highway (1932) Ladies They Talk About Caged So Young, So Bad The Strange One Women's PrisonThe Dark Side: Film Noir & Crime
 The Big Combo Suddenly, Last Summer Reflections in a Golden Eye Gilda The Maltese FalconHorror Films
 The Uninvited The Picture of Dorian Gray Voodoo Island The Haunting The Seventh VictimComedies
 Manhattan Parade Sylvia Scarlett Turnabout That Touch of Mink The Producers Designing WomanCode Busters
 Tea and Sympathy Advise and Consent The Children's Hour Walk on the Wild Side VictimOut and Open
 Staircase The Fox The Boys in the Band The Killing of Sister George''

References

External links
 Screened Out official site

LGBT film festivals in the United States
Turner Classic Movies original programming